Sam Pieter Krant (born 24 May 1998) is a Dutch football player. He plays for Sparta Nijkerk.

Club career
He made his Eerste Divisie debut for Almere City on 21 September 2018 in a game against Den Bosch, as an 83rd-minute substitute for Niek Vossebelt.

References

External links
 

1998 births
Living people
Dutch footballers
Association football midfielders
Almere City FC players
Sparta Nijkerk players
Eerste Divisie players
Tweede Divisie players
Derde Divisie players